The  is a limited express electric multiple unit (EMU) train type operated in Japan by the private railway operator Nankai Electric Railway. These 6-car trains were introduced in 1994 on the new Rapi:t limited express service on the Nankai Airport Line serving Kansai International Airport, which opened on 4 September 1994.

Operations
The 50000 series is used on the Airport Line Rapi:t limited express services. The trains run between Namba and Chiyoda Depot, and have also been used occasionally on special-event services to Wakayamashi and Misakikoen. Since November 2022, the type has also been used on Semboku Liner limited express services on the Semboku Rapid Railway Line.

Design
The external styling of the train was the work of Hiroyuki Wakabayashi, an architect who was also responsible for designing Uji Station on the Keihan Uji Line. The design theme was "Outdated Future", and is the reason for the train's futuristic and retro styling. The end cars feature streamlined cabs with no gangway connections. The cars are painted an all-over metallic deep navy blue colour. The side windows are elliptical in shape, giving an aircraft-like appearance.

Formation
As of 1 April 2013, the fleet consists of six 6-car sets with three motored ("M") cars and three non-powered trailer ("T") cars formed as shown below, with car 1 at the Wakayama end.

 Cars 2 and 5 are each fitted with two cross-arm type pantographs.
 Cars 5 and 6 have "Super Seat" accommodation.
 Cars 3 and 5 have toilets.

Interior
All seats in standard and super-seat cars (Nos. 5 and 6) are reserved and no smoking. Cars 3 and 5 feature a service counter and vending machines.

Livery variations

Mobile Suit Gundam UC × Limited Express Rapi:t Neo Zeon Version (April - June 2014)
One trainset was repainted in an all-over red livery in a tie-up coinciding with the release of Episode 7 of the Mobile Suit Gundam Unicorn series and to mark the 20th anniversary of the opening of the Nankai Airport Line. The repainted set returned to service on 26 April 2014 and ran until 30 June.

Peach × Rapi:t Happy Liner (September 2014 - August 2015)
From 7 September 2014, one 50000 series set was reliveried in a special "Peach × Rapi:t Happy Liner" livery as part of a promotional tie-up with the low-cost airline Peach Aviation. The reliveried trainset was scheduled to operate until 31 August 2015.

Star Wars: The Force Awakens livery (November 2015 - May 2016)
From 21 November 2015, a 50000 series set was reliveried in a special Star Wars: The Force Awakens black livery to mark the nationwide release of the film Star Wars: The Force Awakens in December. The reliveried trainset was scheduled to operate until 8 May 2016.

References

External links

 

Electric multiple units of Japan
Train-related introductions in 1994
Nankai Electric Railway rolling stock
1500 V DC multiple units of Japan
Tokyu Car multiple units